Kartoffelklöße or kartoffelklösse (both pl.), also called kartoffelknödel, are a type of potato dumpling. They often contain a crouton, ham, or sauerkraut filling.

The dumplings are known throughout Germany and Austria but are most common in Bavaria, Thuringia, and Rhineland. In Bavaria similar dumplings are called reiberknödel (from "to grate"), in Swabia gleeß and gneedl, in Franconia gniedla or klueß and in Austria erdäpfelknödel. The dish is also known in other northern and eastern European countries by various names.

History 
According to the Register of Traditional Foodstuffs of the Austrian Federal Ministry of Agriculture, Regions and Tourism, potato dumplings have been known in Germany and Austria for only a couple of centuries, as opposed to other types of dumpling which date back to at least  2500 BC and likely into the region's Neolithic period. Potatoes are native to South America and were introduced to Europe during the Columbian Exchange.

Preparation and serving 

Starchy or "floury" potatoes are peeled, boiled, mashed, mixed with flour, eggs, and seasonings, kneaded into a dough, and formed into dumplings. The dumplings are often stuffed with a crouton, ham, or sauerkraut filling.

The dumplings are simmered; some recipes call for them to be allowed to cool  then fried. They are served hot as a side dish, often with a roast, roulade, stew, or sauerbraten, with or without a sauce or gravy.

Leftover dumplings are sometimes sliced and fried in butter or bacon fat.

Many home cooks use packaged instant dumplings.

Similar dishes 
Other similar dishes are Thuringian dumplings (made from a mixture of raw and boiled potatoes) and Vogtland dumplings (made from a mixture of raw potatoes and semolina pudding).

Potato dumplings mixed with flour are also known in Scandinavian cuisine. Names include raspeball, kumle, kompe, palt or kroppkakor, pitepalt, and öländska kroppkakor.

The Italian dish gnocchi is another version of a potato-based dumpling.

See also 

 Kartoffel, a derogatory or self-deprecatory term for German people
 List of dumplings
 List of potato dishes

References

Further reading 
 
 

German cuisine
Dumplings
Austrian cuisine
Potato dishes
Stuffed dishes